Estela Susana Lizano Soberón (born March 29, 1957) is a Mexican astrophysicist and researcher. She has specialized in the theoretical study of star formation.

Studies and teaching
Lizano earned a degree in physics at the School of Sciences of the National Autonomous University of Mexico (UNAM). In 1984 she obtained a master's degree, and in 1988 a doctorate in astronomy at the University of California, Berkeley. From 1990 to 1991 she did postdoctoral work at the Arcetri Astrophysical Observatory.

She has held the chair of Astronomy, Physics, and Mathematics at UNAM, and at the Universidad Michoacana de San Nicolás de Hidalgo, directing several doctoral and undergraduate theses.

Research and academics
She was appointed director of the CRyA for the terms 2007–2011 and 2011–2015.

Lizano is a Level III researcher of the Sistema Nacional de Investigadores. From 1997 to 2003 she participated with the Stellar Training Working Group, and from 2003 to 2009 with the Organizing Committee of the Interstellar Environment Division of the International Astronomical Union. From 2002 to 2004 she was a counselor of the American Astronomical Society.

Publications
Lizano has written popular articles and chapters of books. Her research work has been cited more than 5,500 times. Some titles include:
 "Formation of stars in molecular clouds" in Formación estelar of UNAM and the Fondo de Cultura Económica in 1996
 "Astronomy in Mexico in the 21st Century" in the Estado actual y prospectiva de la ciencia en México of the Mexican Academy of Sciences in 2003
 "The Formation of Stars and Planets" in Siete problemas de la astronomía contemporánea of the National College in 2004
 "How are the Stars Formed?" in Aportaciones científicas y humanísticas en el siglo XX of the Mexican Academy of Sciences in 2008

Awards and distinctions
 Mary Elizabeth Uhl Research Award from the Department of Astronomy of the University of California at Berkeley in 1986
 Scientific Research Award in the area of Exact Sciences from the Mexican Academy of Sciences in 1996
 National University Distinction for Young Academics in the area of Exact Sciences Research from UNAM in 1996
 Guggenheim Fellowship granted by the John Simon Guggenheim Memorial Foundation in 1998–1999
 Award for Scientific Research from the Mexican Society of Physics in 2001
 Award for Scientific and Humanistic Research from the Michoacán State Council of Science and Technology in 2006
  from the UNAM Institute of Physics in 2010
 National Prize for Arts and Sciences in the area of Physical-Mathematical and Natural Sciences granted by the Secretariat of Public Education in 2012.

References

External links
 Curriculum Vitae at UNAM CRyA 

1957 births
Living people
Mexican astrophysicists
National Autonomous University of Mexico alumni
Academic staff of the National Autonomous University of Mexico
National Prize for Arts and Sciences (Mexico)
Scientists from Mexico City
University of California, Berkeley alumni
Women astrophysicists
Academic staff of Universidad Michoacana de San Nicolás de Hidalgo
Members of the Mexican Academy of Sciences